Jelai is a state constituency in Pahang, Malaysia. It is one of the 42 constituencies represented in the Pahang State Legislative Assembly.

Demographics

History

Polling districts 
According to the gazette issued on 31 October 2022, the Cameron Highlands constituency has a total of 29 polling districts.

Representation history

Election results

References 

Pahang state constituencies